The following is a list of all IFT-licensed over-the-air television stations broadcasting in the Mexican state of Querétaro. There are 9 television stations in Querétaro.

List of television stations

|-

|-

|-

|-

|-

|-

|-

|-

References

Television stations in Querétaro
Queretaro